Pierre Mony (23 March 1896 – 1 January 1980) was a French international footballer who was chosen for the France national football team at the 1920 Summer Olympics but did not play.

He was the older brother of Alexis Mony, another former French international footballer.

Sources

References

1896 births
1980 deaths
Footballers from Paris
French footballers
France international footballers
Olympic footballers of France
Footballers at the 1920 Summer Olympics
US Boulogne players
Association football defenders